Elkins Hall is a historic administrative building located on the north side of the campus of Nicholls State University fronting Bayou Lafourche. It was the first building constructed on the campus of what was then known as Francis T. Nicholls State College.

History 
Ground was broken for the construction of Elkins Hall in 1947, and was first used during the 1948–1949 school year. Originally, it was called simply the Main Building, and housed the college's administrative offices, classrooms, laboratories, cafeteria, bookstore, and library. As more buildings were added to the campus, the building was used more exclusively for administrative offices.

The building was named for Dr. Charles Calvert Elkins (1900–1963), founding dean of Francis T. Nicholls Junior College. In 1956, the school was separated from Louisiana State University and designated it a four-year institution, renamed Nicholls State College. Elkins served as its first President from 1956 until his retirement in 1963. Following his death later that year, the building was renamed Charles Calvert Elkins Hall in his honor in 1964.

Elkins Hall building and a  area comprising the lawn and circular drive in front of it were added as Francis T. Nicholls Junior College Main Building to the National Register of Historic Places on February 12, 1999.

Design
Elkins Hall is a two-story brick building built in the Classical Revival style of architecture. It was designed by the New Orleans-based architectural firm Favrot and Reed (now known as Mathes Brierre). In keeping with the Classical Revival style, the building is two rooms deep and features a rectangular floorplan and gable-fronted roof. The front of the building includes a white two-story portico with a triangular pediment featuring a circular window, supported by four columns on square bases. The central upper window features an ornamental wrought iron balustrade.

Renovations over the years have added an elevator (1983) and two additional wings known as Candies Hall (1986) and Picciola Hall (1978), which connect to Elkins Hall via covered walkways.

See also
 Nicholls State University
 National Register of Historic Places listings in Lafourche Parish, Louisiana
 Neoclassical architecture

Notes

Works Cited
 Architecture--Nicholls State University--Buildings, Vertical file, Nicholls State University Archives, Thibodaux, La.
 Architecture--Nicholls State University--Elkins Hall, Vertical file, Nicholls State University Archives, Thibodaux, La.
 
 Harris, Cyril (2006), "Classical Revival Style," Dictionary of Architecture and Construction, New York: McGraw-Hill.
 
 
 
 National Register of Historic Places, Asset Details: Francis T. Nicholls Junior College Main Building, National Park Service. Accessed on 12 October 2016.

Nicholls State University
Neoclassical architecture in Louisiana
University and college administration buildings in the United States
University and college buildings on the National Register of Historic Places in Louisiana
University and college buildings completed in 1948
Buildings and structures in Thibodaux, Louisiana
Thibodaux, Louisiana
National Register of Historic Places in Lafourche Parish, Louisiana
1948 establishments in Louisiana